Byoinzaka no Kubikukuri no Ie, also known as The House of Hanging on Hospital Slope, is a 1979 Japanese film directed by Kon Ichikawa. It is based on Seishi Yokomizo's novel of the same name, and is the fifth film in Kon Ichikawa and Koji Ishizaka's Kindaichi film series.

Plot
Kindaichi Kosuke visits a photo studio to take photo for his passport. There he happens to meet a daughter who came to request a wedding anniversary photo shoot. Kindaichi and the owner of the photo studio visit a house called Byoinzaka no Kubikukuri no Ie to hand that photo to her.

Cast

 Kōji Ishizaka as Kindaichi Kosuke
 Masao Kusakari as Hinatsu Mokutarō
 Takeshi Katō as Detective Todoriki
 Junko Sakurada as Igarashi Chizuru
 Yoshiko Sakuma as Hogen Yayoi
 Hideji Ōtaki as Kanō
 Akiji Kobayashi as Sannosuke
 Kie Nakai
 Teruhiko Aoi as Yamauchi Toshio
 Mitsuko Kusabue as Amamiya Junko
 Eitaro Ozawa as Honjō Tokubei

See also
The Inugami Family, the first film in Kon Ichikawa and Kōji Ishizaka's Kindaichi series. 
Rhyme of Vengeance, the fourth film in Kon Ichikawa and Kōji Ishizaka's Kindaichi series.

References

External links

Films directed by Kon Ichikawa
Films with screenplays by Kon Ichikawa
Films based on Japanese novels
1970s Japanese films